Paul Buchegger (born 4 March 1996) is an Austrian volleyball player, member of the Austria men's national volleyball team and Italian club Tonno Callipo Calabria Vibo Valentia.

Sporting achievements

Clubs
 CEV Challenge Cup
  2017/2018 – with Bunge Ravenna
  2018/2019 – with Vero Volley Monza

 National championships
 2014/2015  Austrian Cup, with UVC Graz

Individual awards
 2018: CEV Challenge Cup – Most Valuable Player

References

External links
 Player profile at CEV.eu
 Player profile at LegaVolley.it 
 Player profile at WorldofVolley.com
 Player profile at Volleybox.net 

1996 births
Living people
Sportspeople from Linz
Austrian expatriate sportspeople in Germany
Expatriate volleyball players in Germany
Austrian expatriate sportspeople in Italy
Expatriate volleyball players in Italy